George Spenton-Foster (11 November 1926 – 26 December 1993) was a British television director and television producer.

For the BBC, Spenton-Foster directed two Doctor Who stories: Image of the Fendahl (1977) and The Ribos Operation (1978).  He also directed four Blake's 7 episodes from its second series in 1978: Weapon, Pressure Point, Voice from the Past and Gambit.

In late 1982, Spenton-Foster left the Liverpool-based soap opera Brookside four days before it aired because of a disagreement over bad language in the dialogue.

References

External links

BBC television producers
British television directors
1926 births
1993 deaths
Alcohol-related deaths in England